Inderbir Singh Nijjar is an Indian politician and the MLA from Amritsar South Assembly constituency. He is current President of Chief Khalsa Diwan. He is a member of the Aam Aadmi Party.

MLA
The Aam Aadmi Party gained a strong 79% majority in the sixteenth Punjab Legislative Assembly by winning 92 out of 117 seats in the 2022 Punjab Legislative Assembly election. MP Bhagwant Mann was sworn in as Chief Minister on 16 March 2022. Nijjar was appointed the pro tem speaker of 16th Punjab legislative Assembly.

Committee assignments of Punjab Legislative Assembly
Member (2022–23) House Committee 
Member (2022–23) Committee on Questions & References

Cabinet Minister
5 MLAs including Inderbir Singh Nijjar were inducted into the cabinet and their swearing in ceremony took place on 4 July 2022. On 5 July, Bhagwant Mann announced the expansion of his cabinet of ministers with five new ministers to the departments of Punjab state government. Inderbir Singh Nijjar was among the inducted ministers and was given the charge of following departments.

Electoral performance

References

Living people
Punjab, India MLAs 2022–2027
Aam Aadmi Party politicians from Punjab, India
Year of birth missing (living people)
Aam Aadmi Party candidates in the 2017 Punjab Legislative Assembly election